Giancarlo Petrazzuolo (born 7 August 1980) is an Italian former professional tennis player.

Petrazzuolo played right handed.  He participated in both doubles and singles tournaments.

Retirement & Achievements
His last professional match in 2010, Petrazzuolo's final singles ranking was 1421, his doubles 1068, while his highest singles ranking during his career was 217. The Italian professional tennis player, Paolo Lorenzi, was Petrazzuolo's last doubles partner. The highest doubles ranking during his career was 172. Petrazzuolo was coached by Fabrizio Zeppieri.

Petrazzuolo preferred playing on a clay court, where he competed for most of his matches.

Notes

1980 births
Living people
Italian male tennis players